The Gastonia Transit System (GT), is a municipally-owned operator of public transportation in Gastonia, North Carolina. The agency provides service from 5:30 a.m. to 6:30 p.m. on Monday through Friday; and from 8:00 a.m. to 6:00 p.m. on Saturday.

Route list
The following six fixed routes will either begin or end at Bradley Station. The standard fare is $1.25.

Routes as listed are as of July 2018.

References

External links
City of Gastonia, NC transit page

Bus transportation in North Carolina
Gastonia, North Carolina
Transportation in Gaston County, North Carolina